Goltzsche is a German language surname. Notable people with the name include:
 Dieter Goltzsche (1934), German painter and graphic designer
 Rainer Goltzsche (1936), Swiss former freestyle swimmer

References 

German-language surnames